Alonzo de Bárcena (also called de Barzana) was a Spanish Jesuit missionary and linguist who is being designated by the Roman Catholic Church as a candidate for sainthood.

Biography
He was of native of Baeza in Andalusia, southern Spain, born in 1528; died at Cuzco, Peru on 15 January 1598. He became a Jesuit in 1565, and went to Paris in 1569.

He was first destined for the missions of Heartier, whence he was ordered (1577) to Juli, on the shores of Lake Titicaca in Southern Peru. He became one of the founders of this important mission.

Barcena remained in Central Bolivia for eleven years, when the Provincial Juan de Atienza sent him to Tucuman in Argentina. His work among the various tribes of that region and of Paraguay continued until 1593, when he was made Commissary of the Inquisition in those provinces. Exhausted physically by his long and arduous labors, Barcena died at Cuzco in Peru.

Writings
He is credited with having had a practical knowledge of eleven Indian languages and with having written grammars, vocabularies, catechisms in most of them. These manuscripts are possibly still in the archives of Lima. Only one of his writings is known to have been published: a letter full of important ethnographic and linguistic detail, on the Indians of Tucuman, on the Calchaquis and others. The letter published in 1885 is dated 8 September 1594, at Asunción in Paraguay, and is addressed to the Provincial John Sebastian.

Bárcena made an extensive record of the mysterious, now-extinct Cacan language, but as the manuscript is lost, very few identifiable words remain, and the language is unclassifiable at present.

Beatification
In March 2016, the Roman Catholic Diocese of Cusco formally launched an official opening of Alonzo de Barzana's continuation of his cause for sainthood. On December 18, 2017, he was declared by Pope Francis to be Venerable on the account of his holy life.

References

1528 births
1598 deaths
People from Baeza
16th-century Spanish Jesuits
Spanish Servants of God
16th-century venerated Christians
Jesuit missionaries in Peru
Spanish Roman Catholic missionaries
Jesuit missionaries in Paraguay
Jesuit missionaries in Bolivia